Weight of the False Self is the eighth studio album by American metalcore band Hatebreed. The album was released on November 27, 2020, through Nuclear Blast.

Critical reception
Max Heilman of Metal Injection stated that "Just by listening to the single 'Instinctive (Slaughterlust)', it's at least clear that Hatebreed hasn't forgotten how to be Hatebreed."

Regarding the work, Dom Lawson of Blabbermouth.net said that "This is their strongest album in over a decade and the perfect antidote to looming grey skies."

Writing for Kerrang!, Olly Thomas noted "a certain predictability" in the album and gave it 3 out of 5 stars.

Track listing

Charts

References

2020 albums
Hatebreed albums
Albums produced by Chris "Zeuss" Harris
Nuclear Blast albums